Charles James Royds (1827–1898) was a pastoralist and politician in Queensland, Australia. He was a Member of the Queensland Legislative Assembly.

Politics
Charles Royds was elected to the Queensland Legislative Assembly in the electoral district of Leichhardt on 4 May 1860 (the 1860 Queensland colonial election). On 8 February 1864, Charles Royds resigned and his brother Edmund Royds won the resulting by-election on 14 April 1864.

On 11 May 1868, his brother Edmund Royds resigned the seat and Charles Royd won the resulting by-election in Leichhardt on 29 June 1868. Charles Royds held the seat until 30 January 1872 when he resigned. His brother Edmund Royds won the resulting by-election on 20 February 1872.

Later life
Royds died on 15 July 1898 at Stevenage, Hertfordshire, England aged 70 years.

See also
 Members of the Queensland Legislative Assembly, 1860–1863; 1863–67; 1867–68; 1868–70; 1870–71; 1871–73

References

Members of the Queensland Legislative Assembly
1827 births
1898 deaths
19th-century Australian politicians